Quisiera ser hombre (in English: I Wish I Was A Man) is a Mexican motion picture released in 1989. Many people think, in a good way, this film helped indirectly to think about homosexuality and travestism in teenagers.

Synopsis  

Manuela (Lucerito) has a lot of difficulties to get work as a fashion designer, since the world of "haute couture" is preferred by men. She decides to change her appearance in order to have luck, so Manuela becomes Manuelito. Immediately find a job as an assistant of Miguel (Guillermo Capetillo), who is also a designer. Miguel offers to share his department, and Manuelito agrees because she/he doesn't have a place to live. This raises a number of funny situations, especially when Miguel is alarmed to know that he is falling in love with his "male friend"..

Cast 
 Lucerito as Manuela/Manuel
 Guillermo Capetillo as Miguel
 Erika Magnus as Mariana
 Carlos Riquelme as Doctor
 Amparo Arozamena as Chona

External links 
 

1989 films
Mexican action comedy films
1980s Spanish-language films
Mexican crime comedy films
1980s Mexican films